The Ponte Velha de Mértola ("Old Bridge of Mértola"), also referred to as the Ponte Branca or Torre do Rio, is a structure located along the Guadiana River, in the civil parish of Mértola, municipality of Mértola, in the Portuguese district of Beja. Although named a bridge, the structure is the remains of a wharf and fortified port, linked to the defensive curtain of the walled city.

History

It is difficult to attribute a valid chronology, because there are few comparable architectural structures; this structure was constructed between the 9th and late 12th centuries, during the Arab occupation of the Iberian peninsula. It is likely to have been destroyed at the end of the 12th century, when they abandoned the settlement.

The structure was successively confused with a bridge. It was referred to as a bridge in the 1254 foral (charter), in the design of the coat-of-arms of D. Duarte (dating to 1500), referring to as "the piers constructed by the Moors", in the Memórias Paroquiais.

In 1956, there was a decision by the Junta Autónoma de Estradas to recuperate the structure.

Architecture

The remnants of the structure are situated on the right margin of the Guadiana River, alongside the walls of the old city of Mértola, near the Porta da Ribeira.

The vestiges of port and fortified wharf of which, only six piers in a curvilinear pattern, with half reinforced with talhmares, remain. There are no vestiges on the other margin of the river, and the depth of the river is such that it is difficult to mount other piers. In addition to protect the margin, the construction permits (in case of need) the passage to the other bank by barge, used in defense and access to water.

It is an aqueduct to support the village, comparable to ones found in Fez and Síria. It is a rare example of port and fortified wharf, constructed during the Muslim occupation, reusing the material remaining from the Roman residency.

See also
 List of bridges in Portugal

References

Notes

Sources
 
 
 
 
 

Bridges in Beja District
Buildings and structures in Mértola
Mértola
National monuments in Beja District
Listed bridges in Portugal